Yavuz Bingöl (born 7 October 1964) is a Turkish folk music singer and actor.

Early life
Bingöl was born in Istanbul, Turkey in 1964 to teacher Yılmaz Bingöl and folk singer Senem Akkaş (better known with her stage name Şahsenem Bacı), both hailing from Sarıkamış district.

Music career
Bingöl enrolled at the Ankara State Conservatory in 1977 under influence from his mother but following his parents' divorce, he left the Conservatory in 1979 and moved to İzmir where his mother settled and started to work in menial jobs to support his family. He could return to music only by 1983 and founded with his friend Nihat Aydın the protest music band Atmacalar in 1989. The band changed its name to Umuda Ezgi in 1991. Bingöl left the band in 1995 and released his first solo album Sen Türkülerini Söyle the same year.

Acting career
Bingöl was in several miniseries on Turkish TV, including Bayanlar Baylar, Ah Be İstanbul and Yanık Koza. He also did the romance series Zerda and the sitcom Eşref Saati. His 2008 films made both great success: Three Monkeys premiered in competition at the 2008 Cannes Film Festival, where its director Nuri Bilge Ceylan won the Award for Best Director. Bingöl's another film, released into English, He's in the Army Now was nominated for best Turkish film at the Istanbul International Film Festival.

Personal life
Bingöl announced his fourth marriage with pop music singer Öykü Gürman (b. 1982) in 2014 and the couple married on 4 August 2015.

Bingöl has a daughter named Türkü Sinem (b. 1988) from his first marriage. She is studying in the United States and working as a fashion model.

Filmography
 Teşkilat (2021) - Adem Seyhan
 Sevda Kuşun Kanadında (2016) - Zafer Erbay
 Aşk Zamanı (2015) - Orhan
 Aşk Sana Benzer (2015) - Yusuf Baba
 Karagül (2013–2015) - Fırat Mercan
 Çanakkale Çocukları (2012)
 Bulutların Ötesi (2012) - Bekir Aksu
 Mevsim Çiçek Açtı (2012)
 İstanbul (2011) - Halil
 Yangın Var (2011) - Diyarbakır Mayor
 72. Koğuş (2011) - Kaptan
 Kurtuluş Son Durak (2011) - Hüseyin
 Ateşe Yürümek (2010) - Fikret
 Gecenin Kanatları (2009) - Ali Rıza
 Üç Maymun (2008) - Eyüp
 Eşref Saati (2007-2008) - Kara Eşref
 Beyaz Melek (2007) - Hıdır
 Eve Dönüş (2006)
 O Şimdi Mahkum (2005) - Karlıdağ
 Yanık Koza (2005) - Galip Çelebi
 Ah Be İstanbul (2004) - Metin
 Zerda (2002) - Şahin Eroğlu
 Bayanlar Baylar (2002) - Ozan
 O Şimdi Asker (2002) - Karlıdağ
 Salkım Hanımın Taneleri (1999) - Asker
 Cumhuriyet (1998) - Yahya Hayati Bey

Discography
Gün Işımış (with Atmacalar, 1990) Ezgi Müzik
Örgütlemişler Baharı (with Umuda Ezgi, 1991) Ezgi Müzik
Ateş Dağları Sarmış (with Umuda Ezgi, 1993) Ezgi Müzik
Onların Türküsü (with Umuda Ezgi, 1995) Ada Müzik
Sen Türkülerini Söyle (1995) Ada Müzik
Baharım Sensin (1997) Ada Müzik
Gülen Az (1998) Prestij Müzik
Sitemdir (1999) Prestij Müzik
Üşüdüm Biraz (2000) Sony
Umuda Ezgi'ler... (with Nihat Aydın, 2000) Ada Müzik
Belki Yine Gelirsin (2002) Sony

References

External links
 
 Official website 
 Three Monkeys

1964 births
Living people
Musicians from Istanbul
Alevi singers
Turkish male television actors
Turkish folk singers
Turkish male singers
Turkish singer-songwriters
Turkish Alevis
Turkish male film actors